Monster Union is a South Korean production and distribution company founded on June 9, 2016. It is a subsidiary of the Korean Broadcasting System (KBS).

Works

Television series

Television shows

References

External links
 

Korean Broadcasting System subsidiaries
2016 establishments in South Korea
Television production companies of South Korea
Companies based in Seoul
Mass media companies established in 2016